Michael Harold Cooke Gutteridge (1908-1935) was an English athlete.

Athletics
He competed in the 880 yards at the 1930 British Empire Games for England  and also competed in the 880 yards at the 1934 British Empire Games in London.

Personal life
He was an undergraduate at the time of the 1930 Games and later a lieutenant in the Royal Tank Corps.

References

1908 births
1935 deaths
English male middle-distance runners
Athletes (track and field) at the 1930 British Empire Games
Athletes (track and field) at the 1934 British Empire Games
Commonwealth Games competitors for England